Computer Graphics was a publication of ACM SIGGRAPH. It served as its newsletter, and has published the yearly SIGGRAPH Conference Proceedings up to 2003, as well as a variety of papers on a quarterly basis. The last edition was published in 2011.

External links
 Online archive

Computer graphics organizations
Association for Computing Machinery magazines
Publications with year of establishment missing
Magazines disestablished in 2011
Conference proceedings published in serials
Newsletters
Defunct computer magazines